Iridictyon myersi is a species of broad-winged damselfly in the family Calopterygidae. It is found in South America.

The IUCN conservation status of Iridictyon myersi is "LC", least concern, with no immediate threat to the species' survival. The IUCN status was reviewed in 2007.

References

Further reading

 

Calopterygidae
Articles created by Qbugbot
Insects described in 1940